Joe Carey Ellington Jr. (born May 12, 1959 in Flushing, Queens, New York) is an American politician and a Republican member of the West Virginia House of Delegates representing District 27 since January 12, 2013. Ellington served consecutively from January 2011 until January 2013 in the District 25 seat.

Education
Ellington earned his BS from Guilford College, his MS and PhD from Duke University, and his MD from Wake Forest School of Medicine.

Elections
2012 Redistricted to District 27, Ellington ran in the three-way May 8, 2012 Republican Primary and placed second with 1,581 votes (32.8%), and placed second in the six-way November 6, 2012 General election with 9,930 votes (20.1%) behind former Senator John Shott and ahead of Republican Representative Marty Gearheart (Shott and Gearheart had both been redistricted from District 24) and Democratic nominees Ryan Flanigan, Greg Ball, and Bill Morefield, who had run for a District 25 seat in 2006 and 2010.
2006 To challenge District 25 incumbent Democratic Representative Marshall Long, Ellington ran in the four-way 2006 Republican Primary but did not place; incumbent Representatives Long and Republican Thomas M. Porter were both re-elected in the four-way two-position November 7, 2006 General election.
2008 To challenge Representative Long again, Ellington ran in the May 13, 2008 Republican Primary and placed second with 756 votes (36.4%), but lost four-way two-position November 4, 2008 General election to Democratic nominee John Frazier and incumbent Republican Representative Porter; Long placed third and Ellington placed fourth.
2010 Ellington ran in the May 11, 2010 Republican Primary and placed second with 747 votes (39.2%), Representative Porter died after the primary, but was replaced on the ballot for the four-way two-position November 2, 2010 General election; Ellington placed second with 4,693 votes (26.6%) behind Representative Frazier and ahead of Charles Terry (who had replaced Porter on the ballot) and Democratic nominee Billy Morefield.

References

External links
Official page at the West Virginia Legislature

Joe Ellington at Ballotpedia
Joe C. Ellington Jr. at the National Institute on Money in State Politics

1959 births
Living people
Duke University alumni
Guilford College alumni
Republican Party members of the West Virginia House of Delegates
People from Flushing, Queens
People from Princeton, West Virginia
Physicians from West Virginia
Wake Forest School of Medicine alumni
21st-century American politicians